Eupomatia barbata, also named small bolwarra, is a species of small shrubs, of the Australian continent ancient plant family Eupomatiaceae.

They are endemic to the wet tropics rainforests of northeastern Queensland, between the Cooktown area and the Ingham area (ca.  distance), from sea level to about  altitude.

North Queensland small bolwarra shrubs have had specimens collected since the late 1800s or earlier, however their formal description using this species name was only recently published in 2002 by botanist Laurie W. Jessup.

References 

Magnoliales
Magnoliids of Australia
Flora of Queensland